Wladimir Alekseevich Ivanow (Влади́мир Алексе́евич Ивано́в; November 3, 1886- June 19, 1970) was a  Russian orientalist.  He was born in Saint Petersburg, Russia and died in Tehran, Iran. He was a scholar of Islam, with a particular focus on Ismailism. He graduated in 1907 and joined the faculty of Oriental Languages of the University of St. Petersburg.

Bibliography

Catalogue of the Arabic manuscripts in the collection of the Royal Asiatic Society of Bengal, Asiatic Society (Calcutta, India) Library, Wladimir Ivanow, revised by  M. Hidayat Hosain. Royal Asiatic Society of Bengal, (1939), 689 pages, 2 vols., 221 pages.
The Gabri Dialect Spoken by the Zoroastrians of Persia (1940)
Ismaili tradition concerning the rise of the Fatimids (1942). Volume 10 of the  Islamic Research Association Series, Oxford Univ. Pr. in Komm., 450 pages .
 Ibn-al-Qaddah: (The Alleged Founder of Ismailism) (1946). The Ismaili Foundation, 2nd.  edition, (1957), 169 pages,
On the Recognition of the Imam: Or Fasl Dar Bayan-i Shinakht-i Imam (1947)
Nāṣir-i Khusraw and Ismailism (1948).
Studies in early Persian Ismailism. E.J. Brill, (1948) - 202 pages
 Naṣīr al-Dīn Muḥammad ibn Muḥammad Ṭūsī (translation)
Catalogue of the Arabic Manuscripts in the Collection of the Asiatic Society of Bengal (1951), with M. Hidayat Hosain, M. Mahfuz-ul-Haq, M. Ishaque .
Studies in early Persian Ismailism, 2nd ed.  (1955)
Problems in Nasir-i Khusraw's Biography (1956)

References

1886 births
1970 deaths
White Russian emigrants to Iran
Writers from Saint Petersburg
Russian orientalists
Iranian people of Russian descent
Academic staff of Saint Petersburg State University
Emigrants from the Russian Empire to Iran
Ismailism
Scholars of Shia Islam